Salmo fibreni, or the Fibreno trout, is a freshwater salmonid fish, endemic to Lago di Posta Fibreno in central Italy.

The size of Lago di Posta Fibreno is only 0.29 km². It is a narrow lake 1.1 km long, 100–300 m wide, situated 289 m above sea level. The lake is in a karstic terrain and rich in underwater springs. The Fibreno trout breeds close to these springs in mid-winter.  It is sympatric with the more widespread Salmo cettii (Mediterranean trout), and separated from it by the breeding time: S. cettii spawns in early spring.

References

fibreni
Fish of Europe
Endemic fauna of Italy
Fish described in 1990